Desmiphora pallida is a species of beetle in the family Cerambycidae. It was described by Henry Walter Bates in 1874. It is known from Brazil, Bolivia, Jamaica and Peru.

References

Desmiphora
Beetles described in 1874